A Doggone Hollywood is a 2017 American children's film about a telepathic dog starring Jesse the Jack Russell, a dog who was a YouTube star. It is the sequel to the 2016 film A Doggone Christmas.

Cast
Paul Logan as Dirk Stevens
Jesse the Jack Russell Terrier as Murphy

References

External links

2017 films
Films directed by Jim Wynorski
American children's films
American television films
2010s English-language films
2010s American films